Lobutcha Creek is a stream in the U.S. state of Mississippi. It is a tributary to the Pearl River.

Lobutcha  is a name derived from the Choctaw language purported to mean "boiled food" or "to make warm".

References

Rivers of Mississippi
Rivers of Attala County, Mississippi
Rivers of Choctaw County, Mississippi
Rivers of Leake County, Mississippi
Rivers of Winston County, Mississippi
Tributaries of the Pearl River (Mississippi–Louisiana)
Mississippi placenames of Native American origin